Stubbes is a surname. Notable people with the surname include:

John Stubbes, 15th-century British Anglican archdeacon
Katherine Stubbes, 16th-century English woman and subject of the biography A Chrystall Glasse for Christian Women

See also
Stubbs (disambiguation)